The Stade Perruc is a stadium in Hyères, France. It is currently used mostly for football matches and is the home stadium of Hyères FC. It hosted the club's matches in the 1932–33 Division 1, the first professional football season in France. The stadium has a capacity of 1,760.

References

External links
 Webpage about the stadium

Football venues in France
Sports venues in Var (department)
Sports venues completed in 1951